The Daryan Dam, also spelled Darian, is an embankment dam constructed on the Sirvan River just north of Daryan in Paveh County, Kermanshah Province, Iran. The dam also has a 210 MW hydroelectric power station. Construction on the dam began in 2009 and the dam began to fill its reservoir in late November 2015. The Darian Dam Archaeological Salvage Program (DDASP) was planned by Iranian Center for Archaeological Research before flooding the reservoir. As a result, a number of important archaeological sites were discovered and some were excavated. The power station was commissioned in 2018. The dam's diversion tunnel was completed in June 2011. The dam was designed by Stucky of France and consultation was provided by Mahab Ghodss, International Consulting Engineering Co. In August 2010 Farab Co. won the contract to build the power station. In 2011, workers on the project held a protest against unpaid wages. The dam is also the subject of protest due to the forced relocations and ecological/cultural impact its reservoir will have.

See also

 List of dams and reservoirs in Iran
 List of power stations in Iran
 Garan Dam – upstream on the Garan River

References

Dams in Kermanshah Province
Dams on the Diyala (Sirwan) River
Rock-filled dams
Dams completed in 2018
Interbasin transfer
Hydroelectric power stations in Iran
Buildings and structures in Kermanshah Province
Paveh County
Iranian Kurdistan